Cyclophora subrosea is a moth in the  family Geometridae. It is found in New Guinea and on Seram.

References

Moths described in 1906
Cyclophora (moth)
Moths of Asia